S. Sowmya (born 16 April 1969) is a Carnatic music singer. She learnt music initially from her father Dr. Srinivasan, and later from Dr. S. Ramanathan and Smt.T. Muktha. She received the Sangeetha Kalanidhi title by Madras Music Academy in 2019 and the Isai Perarignar by the Tamil Isai Sangam in 2022. She was appointed by the Govt of Tamil Nadu as Vice Chancellor of the Tamil Nadu Dr J Jayalalithaa Music & Fine Arts University on April 8th 2022, for a period of three years.

Education 

 Ph. D. (Univ. of Madras, 2012) for dissertation "A study of the effect of temperature variations on the pitch of a double-headed drum (mridanga)"
 M.Sc. (Chemistry), Indian Institute of Technology, Madras, 1992

Musical career 
Sowmya made her concert debut at the age of 11 at the samadhi of Sadasiva Brahmendra, in Nerur. In 1986, she had her first performance at the Madras Music Academy, aged just 17 and thereafter performed every year for 35 years. She has performed in all major sabhas all over India and has presented her concerts in the United States of America, Canada, United Kingdom, Australia, United Arab Emirates, Germany, France, Singapore, Malaysia, Switzerland, Belgium, New Zealand, Tanzania, Sri Lanka, and various other destinations throughout the world. She made her film debut as an actress in the movie Vaanavil Vaazhkai, which was released on 13 February 2015. Sowmya has appeared as a guest judge in several episodes of Vijay TV's musical reality-talent shows, including seasons 2, 3, and 4 of Airtel Super Singer, and seasons 2, 3, and 4 of Airtel Super Singer Junior. She was a permanent judge in seasons 1 and 2 of Raj TV's Carnatic music reality-talent show, Tanishq Swarna Sangeetham. Sowmya was also a permanent judge in seasons 1 and 2 of Jaya TV's Carnatic music reality-talent show, "Carnatic Music Idol".

In 1998, Sowmya co-founded Carnatica - an institution dedicated to classical music & dance instruction, archival, talent search and other related activities. She also co-authored the first comprehensive reference CD-ROM on Carnatic music, Nadanubhava.  She is a visiting professor at the Advanced School of Carnatic Music of the Music Academy Madras. She has served as a member of the academic council of the Tamil Nadu Music & Fine Arts University and a member of the Governing Body of the Kalakshetra Foundation.

References

External links

 

Living people
Women Carnatic singers
Carnatic singers
1969 births
Singers from Tamil Nadu
Indian women classical singers
20th-century Indian singers
20th-century Indian women singers
21st-century Indian women singers
21st-century Indian singers
Women musicians from Tamil Nadu